Moments is a 1974 British drama film directed by Peter Crane and starring Keith Michell, Angharad Rees and Bill Fraser. The screenplay concerns a man who has lost his wife and daughter in a car crash who returns to a hotel where he had once enjoyed happiness.

Cast
 Keith Michell as Peter Samuelson
 Angharad Rees as Chrissy
 Bill Fraser as Mr. Fleming
 Keith Bell as John
 Jeanette Sterke as Mrs. Samuelson
 Donald Hewlett as Mr. Samuelson
 Valerie Minifie as Peter's Wife
 Paul Michell as Young Peter
 Helena Michell as Peter's Friend

References

External links

1974 films
1974 drama films
British drama films
Films directed by Peter Crane
Films scored by John Cameron
1970s English-language films
1970s British films